Oceanisphaera is a Gram-negative and non-spore-forming genus of bacteria from the family of Aeromonadaceae.

References

Aeromonadales
Bacteria genera
Taxa described in 2003